Jean-Baptiste Marie Fouque (July 2, 1819 – April 11, 1880), also anglicised as Jean Marius Fouque or Marius Fouque, was a French painter specialising in portraits and mythological subjects.

Biography

Born in Arles in 1819, the son of the locksmith Honorat Fouque and Marguerite Barbier, Jean-Baptiste studied painting under the Arlesian painter and archaeologist François Huard. He was awarded a scholarship from the city council of Arles, to study at the Beaux-Arts de Paris. There, he studied under the direction of Joseph-Léon de Lestang-Parade and Léon Cogniet. In 1854 he married Marie Perrine Leray, a seamstress from Rennes. The couple had two sons: Émile, born in 1849, and Adrien, born in 1855.

The first exhibition of Fouque's art was in 1846, and resulted in a steady stream of commissions for the government of the Second French Empire. He produced portraits of both Emperor Napoleon III and Empress Eugénie de Montijo, as well as many foreign nobles and royals such as Princess Tatiana Alexandrovna Yusupova of Russia and Rama V, the King of Siam.

In addition to his portraiture, Fouque painted many allegorical and religious works. In 1863, he returned to Arles to paint several altarpieces and other works for the Church of Saint Trophime and the Church of Saint Cesaire.

Collections
Several of Fouque's paintings are in the collection of the Hermitage Museum.

Notable works

 The Sculptor Pradier, Museum of Art and History, Geneva
 Portrait of Rama V, Bang Pa-In Royal Palace, Thailand
 Portrait of Tatiana Alexandrovna Yusupova, State Museum of the History of St. Petersburg
 The Assumption and The Meeting at the Golden Gate, Chapel of Saint Anne, Church of Saint Cesaire, Arles
 Saint Cesaire at the bedside of the prefect of Ravenna, Church of Saint Trophime, Arles
 Purgatory, Chapel for the Souls in Purgatory, Church of Saint Cesaire, Arles

Attributed works
 Virgin of the Immaculate Conception, Church of Saint Trophime, Salin-de-Giraud (Bouches-du-Rhône)
 Saint Trophime of Arles, Church of Saint Trophime, Arles

References

Fouque, Jean-Baptiste Marie
Fouque, Jean-Baptiste Marie
Fouque, Jean-Baptiste Marie
Fouque, Jean-Baptiste Marie